Ceratostoma is a genus of fungi within the Ceratostomataceae family.

Species

Ceratostoma albocoronata
Ceratostoma albomaculans
Ceratostoma arcuatirostre
Ceratostoma asininum
Ceratostoma avocetta
Ceratostoma barbata
Ceratostoma biparasiticum
Ceratostoma caminatum
Ceratostoma capillare
Ceratostoma carpophilum
Ceratostoma cinctum
Ceratostoma cinereum
Ceratostoma conicum
Ceratostoma corticola
Ceratostoma crassicolle
Ceratostoma culmicola
Ceratostoma cuspidatum
Ceratostoma cylindracea
Ceratostoma decipiens
Ceratostoma dispersum
Ceratostoma exasperans
Ceratostoma fairmanii
Ceratostoma fallax
Ceratostoma foliicola
Ceratostoma fuscellum
Ceratostoma geranii
Ceratostoma grumsinianum
Ceratostoma haematorhynchum
Ceratostoma hystricina
Ceratostoma jani-collinum
Ceratostoma javanicum
Ceratostoma juniperina
Ceratostoma juniperinum
Ceratostoma marylandicum
Ceratostoma melanosporioides
Ceratostoma melaspermum
Ceratostoma mexicanense
Ceratostoma moravicum
Ceratostoma mucronatum
Ceratostoma multirostratum
Ceratostoma notarisii
Ceratostoma parasiticum
Ceratostoma penicillus
Ceratostoma plectotheca
Ceratostoma praetervisum
Ceratostoma procumbens
Ceratostoma pyrinum
Ceratostoma querceticola
Ceratostoma robustum
Ceratostoma rosae
Ceratostoma rosellinoides
Ceratostoma rubefaciens
Ceratostoma saponariae
Ceratostoma schulzeri
Ceratostoma setigerum
Ceratostoma spina
Ceratostoma spinella
Ceratostoma spurium
Ceratostoma stilbum
Ceratostoma strictum
Ceratostoma stromaticum
Ceratostoma subdenudatum
Ceratostoma subpilosum
Ceratostoma subrufum
Ceratostoma subulatum
Ceratostoma therryanum
Ceratostoma tinctum
Ceratostoma truncatum
Ceratostoma usterianum
Ceratostoma vasculosum
Ceratostoma venetum
Ceratostoma vitis
Ceratostoma vitreum

References

External links 
 

 
Sordariomycetes genera